Gene Bess (born March 3, 1935) is the former coach of the men's basketball team at Three Rivers Community College in Poplar Bluff, Missouri.

Bess was hired at Three Rivers in 1971. His career win-loss record is 1,300-416 (.757 winning percentage), making him the all-time winningest college basketball coach.  He has won two national junior college basketball titles, in 1979 and 1992, and was the first college coach to reach 1,000 and 1,200 wins. Bess coached NBA player Latrell Sprewell at Three Rivers. Bess announced his retirement from coaching in May 2020 after suffering from health problems in his final years on the bench. Bess was nominated as a finalist to the Basketball Hall of Fame as part of the HOF Class of 2023.

References

1935 births
Living people
Junior college men's basketball coaches in the United States
Basketball coaches from Missouri